Mama Airport  is an airport in Irkutsk Oblast, Russia, located  northwest of Mama on the Vitim River. It is a small airfield near the town center. Angara Airlines serves scheduled flight to Irkutsk (Irkutsk International Airport) three times a week.

Airlines and destinations

References
RussianAirFields.com

Airports built in the Soviet Union
Airports in Irkutsk Oblast